Uganda participated in the 2010 Summer Youth Olympics in Singapore.

Medalists

Athletics

Boys
Track and Road Events

Girls
Track and Road Events

Badminton

Girls

Swimming

Weightlifting

References

External links
Competitors List: Uganda

2010 in Ugandan sport
Nations at the 2010 Summer Youth Olympics
Uganda at the Youth Olympics